Amt Creuzburg is a town in the Wartburgkreis district, in Thuringia, Germany. It was created with effect from 31 December 2019 by the merger of the former municipalities of Creuzburg, Ebenshausen and Mihla. It takes its name from the town Creuzburg, the centre of the new municipality.

References

Wartburgkreis